Diorymeropsis is a genus of flower weevils in the beetle family Curculionidae. There are about 11 described species in Diorymeropsis.

Species
These 11 species belong to the genus Diorymeropsis:
 Diorymeropsis cavimanus Champion & G.C., 1908
 Diorymeropsis disjunctus Champion & G.C., 1908
 Diorymeropsis dispersesquamulatus Hustache, 1950
 Diorymeropsis humilis Hustache, 1950
 Diorymeropsis irritus Kuschel, 1955
 Diorymeropsis lambitus Hustache & A., 1938
 Diorymeropsis obesulus Hustache & A., 1938
 Diorymeropsis piceicollis Champion & G.C., 1908
 Diorymeropsis uncatus Champion & G.C., 1908
 Diorymeropsis vanus Hustache & A., 1938
 Diorymeropsis xanthoxyli (Linell, 1897)

References

Further reading

 
 
 

Baridinae
Articles created by Qbugbot